Wekusko Falls Provincial Park is a provincial park straddling the Grass River and Wekusko Lake, located in central Manitoba on Manitoba Provincial Road 392 near Snow Lake, Manitoba.

See also
List of Manitoba parks
List of Canadian provincial parks

References

External links
Wekusko Falls Provincial Park. Manitoba Conservation and Water Stewardship
Wekusko Falls Lodge
iNaturalist: Wekusko Falls Provincial Park
eBird: Wekusko Falls Provincial Park

Provincial parks of Manitoba
Parks in Northern Manitoba
Protected areas established in 1974
1974 establishments in Manitoba
Protected areas of Manitoba